The Vice-Chancellor of the University of Oxford is the chief executive and leader of the University of Oxford. The following people have been vice-chancellors of the University of Oxford (formally known as The Right Worshipful the Vice-Chancellor):


Chronological list
 1230 – Elyas de Daneis
 1270 – Robert Steeton
 1288 – John Heigham
 1304 – John de Oseworhd
 1311 – Walter Gifford
 1325 – Richard Kamshale
 1333 – Richard FitzRalph
 1336 – John de Ayllesbury
 1337 – John de Reigham
 1347 – Hugh de Willoughby
 1348 – William de Hawkesworth
 1367 – John de Codeford
 1368 – John de Codeford
 1377 – Robert Aylesham
 1382 – Fr Peter Stokes
 1386 – Henry Nafford or Yafford
 1389 – John Lyndon
 1391 – John Ashwardby
 1394 – Richard Ullerston
 1396 – Nicholas Faux
 1397 – William Farendon or Faringdon
 1399 – John Snappe and others
 1401 – William Farendon
 1404 – Griffin Kirkadam
 1405 – William Farendon
 1406 – John Whytehede
 1407 – John Orum
 1422 – John Daventry
 1426 – Richard Roderham
 1430 – Thomas Eglesfield
 1431 – Richard Roderham
 1433 – John Burbach or Hurbach
 1434 – Thomas Gascoigne, Christopher Knolles, John Burbach
 1435 – John Burbach, Thomas Bonyngworth
 1436 – John Burbach, Thomas Greneley
 1437 – John Gorsuch, Thomas Greneley
 1438 – John Gorsuch, William Hawtrine
 1439 – John Gorsuch, John Burbach, Thomas Southam, Thomas Gascoigne
 1440 – John Gorsuch
 1441 – John Gorsuch, Robert Thwaytes, William Babington
 1442 – William Grey, William Babington, John Gorsuch, William Westkarre
 1443 – William Dowson, William Westkarre
 1444 – William Dowson, Richard Hall, William Westkarre
 1445 – William Dowson, John Selot
 1446 – William Westkarre, John Moreton, William Dowson
 1447 – John Burneby, William Dowson
 1448 – John Burneby
 1449 – John Willey, John Burneby, William Dowson
 1450 – Richard Ringstede, John Beke, Roger Bulkeley, John Van
 1451 – John Beke, John Van
 1452 – John Beke, Thomas Tweyn or Yweyn alias Chalke, Thomas Saunders
 1453 – Luke Lacock, Robert Thwayts, Thomas Saunders
 1454 – Thomas Tweyn, Thomas Saunders
 1455 – Thomas Twynge alias Bonifaunt
 1456 – Thomas Saunders
 1457 – Thomas Chippenham
 1458 – Walter Wynhale, Thomas Twynge
 1459 – John Danvers, Thomas Jaune or Jane
 1460 – Thomas Tweyn
 1461 – William Ive, Roger Bulkeley
 1462 – William Ive
 1463 – John Watts, Thomas Chaundler, David Husband, John Mulcaster
 1464 – Laurence Cokkys, Thomas Chaundler, Roger Bulkeley, John Caldbeck, Thomas Person
 1465 – Thomas Smith, Robert Ixworth, John Caldbeck, Thomas Chaundler
 1466 – Thomas Chaundler, John Caldbeck, Thomas Stevyn, Laurence Cokkys, Thomas Hill
 1467 – Thomas Chaundler, Thomas Stevyn, Thomas Walton
 1468 – Thomas Stevyn, Thomas Jaune
 1469 – Robert Tulley, Thomas Jaune
 1470 – Thomas Stevyn
 1480 – John Lane, William Sutton
 1481 – Richard Fitzjames, William Sutton
 1482 – Robert Wrangwais, William Sutton
 1484 – Richard Mayew, Thomas Pawnton
 1485 – Richard Mayew
 1486 – John Taylor
 1487 – Richard Estmond
 1488 – John Coldale
 1489 – John Coldale
 1490 – John Coldale
 1491 – Richard Fitzjames, John Coldale
 1492 – John Coldale
 1493 – Robert Smith
 1497 – William Atwater
 1498 – Thomas Harpur
 1499 – David Hays, William Atwater, Thomas Chaundeler
 1500 – William Atwater
 1501 – Thomas Banke, Hugh Saunders alias Shakspeere
 1502 – William Atwater, Thomas Banke, Hugh Saunders
 1503 – John Thornden or Thornton, John Kynton, Simon Grene alias Fotherby
 1504 – John Kynton, Robert Tehy or Thay
 1505 – Simon Grene, John Roper, John Adams
 1506 – John Thornden, William Fauntleroy
 1507 – John Thornden or Thornton, John Avery, John Kynton
 1508 – William Fauntleroy, John Thornden
 1509 – William Fauntleroy
 1510 – John Thornden, John Mychell
 1511 – William Fauntleroy, Thomas Drax, John Roper, John Cockys, Edmund Wylsford
 1512 – Edmund Wylsford, William Fauntleroy, John Kynton
 1513 – William Fauntleroy, John Kynton, John Thornden
 1514 – John Thornden, Lawrence Stubbs, Edmund Wylsford, Hugh Whytehead
 1515 – Edmund Wylsford
 1516 – Lawrence Stubbs
 1517 – Richard Duck or Doke
 1518 – Richard Duck or Doke
 1519 – Richard Barnack, Richard Duck or Doke
 1520 – William Broke or Brook, Richard Benger
 1521 – Richard Benger
 1522 – Richard Benger
 1523 – Thomas Musgrave
 1527 – Martin Lyndsey, John Cottisford
 1528 – John Cottisford
 1531 – Henry White
 1532 – John Cottisford, William Tresham
 1547 – Walter Wright
 1550 – William Tresham
 1551 – Owen Oglethorpe
 1552 – James Brookes or Brooks, Richard Marshall
 1553 – Richard Marshall
 1554 – John Warner
 1555 – Richard Smyth
 1556 – William Tresham, Thomas Raynolds
 1557 – Thomas Raynolds, Thomas Whyte
 1558 – William Tresham
 1559 – John Warner
 1560 – Francis Babbington
 1561 – Francis Babbington
 1562 – Thomas Whyte
 1564 – John Kennall
 1567 – Thomas Cowper
 1570 – Thomas Cowper
 1571 – Lawrence Humphrey
 1576 – Herbert Westfaling
 1577 – William Cole 
 1578 – Martin Culpepper
 1579 – Tobias Matthew
 1580 – Arthur Yeldard
 1581 – William James
 1582 – Robert Hovenden
 1583 – Thomas Thornton
 1584 – John Underhill
 1585 – Edmund Lilly
 1586 – Daniel Bernard
 1587 – Francis Wyllis
 1588 – Martin Heton
 1589 – Nicholas Bond
 1590 – William James
 1592 – Nicholas Bond
 1593 – Edmund Lilly
 1596 – Thomas Ravys
 1598 – Thomas Singleton
 1599 – Thomas Thornton
 1600 – George Abbot
 1601 – George Ryves
 1602 – John Howson
 1603 – George Abbot
 1604 – John Williams
 1605 – George Abbot
 1606 – Henry Airay
 1607 – John King
 1611 – Thomas Singleton
 1614 – William Goodwyn
 1616 – Arthur Lake
 1617 – William Goodwyn
 1619 – John Prideaux
 1621 – William Piers
 1624 – John Prideaux
 1626 – William Juxon
 1628 – Accepted Frewen
 1630 – William Smyth
 1632 – Brian Duppa
 1634 – Robert Pincke
 1636 – Richard Baylie
 1638 – Accepted Frewen
 1640 – Christopher Potter
 1641 – John Prideaux
 1642 – John Prideaux in absentia (duties performed by Robert Pincke and then John Tolson as Pro-Vice-Chancellors)
 1643 – John Tolson, Robert Pincke
 1645 – Samuel Fell
 1648 – Edward Reynolds
 1650 – Daniel Greenwood
 1652 – John Owen
 1657 – John Conant
 1660 – Paul Hood
 1661 – Richard Baylie
 1662 – Walter Blandford
 1664 – Robert Say
 1666 – John Fell
 1669 – Peter Mews
 1673 – Ralph Bathurst
 1676 – Henry Clerk
 1677 – John Nicholas
 1679 – Timothy Halton
 1682 – John Lloyd
 1685 – Timothy Halton
 1686 – John Venn
 1687 – Gilbert Ironside
 1689 – Jonathan Edwards
 1692 – Henry Aldrich
 1695 – Fitzherbert Adams
 1697 – John Meare
 1698 – William Paynter
 1700 – Roger Mander
 1702 – William Delaune
 1706 – William Lancaster
 1710 – Thomas Brathwait
 1712 – Bernard Gardiner
 1715 – John Baron
 1718 – Robert Shippen
 1723 – John Mather
 1728 – Edward Butler
 1732 – William Holmes
 1735 – Stephen Niblett
 1738 – Theophilus Leigh
 1741 – Walter Hodges
 1744 – Euseby Isham
 1747 – John Purnell
 1750 – John Browne
 1753 – George Huddesford
 1756 – Thomas Randolph
 1759 – Joseph Browne
 1765 – David Durell
 1768 – Nathan Wetherell
 1772 – Thomas Fothergill
 1776 – George Horne
 1780 – Samuel Dennis
 1784 – Joseph Chapman
 1788 – John Cooke
 1792 – John Wills
 1796 – Scrope Berdmore
 1797 – Edmund Isham
 1798 – Michael Marlow
 1802 – Whittington Landon
 1806 – Henry Richards
 1807 – John Parsons
 1810 – John Cole
 1814 – Thomas Lee
 1818 – Frodsham Hodson
 1820 – George William Hall
 1824 – Richard Jenkyns
 1828 – John Collier Jones
 1832 – George Rowley
 1836 – Ashhurst Turner Gilbert
 1840 – Philip Wynter
 1844 – Benjamin Parsons Symons
 1848 – Frederick Charles Plumptre
 1852 – Richard Lynch Cotton
 1856 – David Williams
 1858 – Francis Jeune
 1862 – John Prideaux Lightfoot
 1866 – Francis Leighton
 1870 – Henry George Liddell
 1874 – James Edwards Sewell
 1878 – Evan Evans
 1882 – Benjamin Jowett
 1886 – James Bellamy
 1890 – Henry Boyd
 1894 – John Richard Magrath
 1898 – Sir William Reynell Anson
 1899 – Thomas Fowler
 1901 – David Binning Monro
 1904 – William Walter Merry
 1906 – Thomas Herbert Warren
 1910 – Charles Buller Heberden
 1913 – Thomas Banks Strong
 1917 – Herbert Edward Douglas Blakiston
 1920 – Lewis Richard Farnell
 1923 – Joseph Wells
 1926 – Francis William Pember
 1929 – Frederick Homes Dudden
 1932 – Francis John Lys
 1935 – Alexander Dunlop Lindsay
 1938 – George Stuart Gordon
 1941 – Sir William David Ross
 1944 – Sir Richard Winn Livingstone
 1947 – William Teulon Swan Stallybrass
 1948 – The Very Reverend John Lowe
 1951 – Sir Cecil Maurice Bowra
 1954 – Alic Halford Smith
 1957 – John Cecil Masterman
 1958 – Thomas Sherrer Ross Boase
 1960 – Arthur Lionel Pugh Norrington
 1962 – Walter Fraser Oakeshott
 1964 – Kenneth Clinton Wheare
 1966 – John Norman Davidson Kelly
 1966 – Kenneth Turpin
 1969 – Alan Bullock, Lord Bullock of Leafield
 1973 – Sir John Habakkuk
 1977 – Sir Rex Richards
 1981 – Sir Geoffrey Warnock
 1985 – Lord Neill of Bladen
 1989 – Sir Richard Southwood
 1993 – Sir Peter North
 1997 – Sir Colin Lucas
 2004 – John Hood
 2009 – Andrew D. Hamilton
 2016 – Dame Louise Richardson
 2023 – Irene Tracey

See also 
 List of chancellors of the University of Oxford
 List of University of Oxford people
 List of vice-chancellors of the University of Cambridge

References 

History of the University of Oxford
Lists of people associated with the University of Oxford

Oxford
Oxford